Werner Vogel (born 11 October 1948) is an Austrian cross-country skier. He competed in the men's 15 kilometre event at the 1976 Winter Olympics.

References

1948 births
Living people
Austrian male cross-country skiers
Olympic cross-country skiers of Austria
Cross-country skiers at the 1976 Winter Olympics
Sportspeople from Styria
People from Murtal District
20th-century Austrian people